Love Odd is an Armenian adventure comedy written by Robert Martirosyan and directed by Arman Marutyan and Vahagn Khachatryan, starring Hayk Marutyan and Garik Papoyan.

Plot
Two friends, Aram and Rafo, who have a joint business decide to raise money to save it. They decide to resort to fraud related to the women's tennis match in order to get out of the hopeless situation. One of them, who is in love with one of the tennis players however, wants to marry Aghvan's daughter, Piruz, who is a local authority. The romantic hero is persecuted and falls in love with Piruz, his father Aghvan, and the latter's wife, Zhanna, who tries to seduce the hero.

Cast
 Hayk Marutyan as Aram
 Garik Papoyan as Rafo
 Eteri Voskanyan as Ani
 Armine Poghosyan as Piruz
 Rudolph Ghevondyan as Aghvan
 Luiza Nersisyan as Janna
 Jenya Mkrtumyan as Maret
 Khoren Levonyan as Bagrat
 Anna Harutyunyan as Iveta
 Levon Harutyunyan as Leader
 Armush

External links

References

Armenian comedy films
2015 comedy films
Films shot in Armenia
Hayk Marutyan films